The State of Kedah Star of Valour (Bahasa Melayu: Bintang Keberanian Negeri Kedah) is the supreme honorific war decoration of the Sultanate of Kedah

History 
It was founded by Sultan Badlishah of Kedah on 30 October 1952.

Recipients 
It is as a reward for acts of supreme valour performed by the military or civilians in circumstances of extreme danger during peacetime or war. There should be at least two witnesses to a candidate's deed. This award may be conferred posthumously.

Classes 
It is awarded in one class: 
  Star - Post-nominal letters : BKK

Insignia 
It composed of a bronze star hung from a dark red ribbon with a central dark blue stripe. Photos :  1 & 2

References 

Military awards and decorations of Malaysia
Orders, decorations, and medals of Kedah